Chiloglanis batesii is a species of upside-down catfish found widely in Western and Central Africa.  This species grows to a length of  TL.

Chiloglanis batesii ( fish species)

CLASSIFICATION / Name

Actinopterygii (ray- finned fishes)

Siluriformes (catfish)

Mochokidal (squeakers or upside down cat fishes)

Scientific name: chiloglanis batesii

Common name: Sucker mouth catfish (Rapid catfish).

Environment: Fresh water ; blackish, benthopelagic( deep range). Tropical; 5°N-10°S.

Description: 

Dorsal soft rays (tota):56, vertebrae 30-33. This genus is the African equivalent of the sucker mouth catfishes of South America and has a sucking disc that helps them to clinging rocks in fast flowing rivers. It's not an easy genus to identify to species.

Aquarium are good oxygenated water from a power filter sand or gravel substrate with smooth rocks or peddles. This dorsal and pectoral find are Sharp and can cause wounds if not handled carefully.

Sexual difference: usually in the form of a different shaped caudal fin.

Diet/ nutrition: algae, fly larvae food, blood work, flake food.

Distribution. Africa: Cameroon, central Africa republic, Chad, Congo CDM republic, Guinea, Mali, Nigeria.

South Cameroon: Eflulen and stream tributaries of the lobi river, 15-26 miles. Southwest of Eflulen

Temperature: 20-26( 23-26°C) ( 73-79°F).

pH 6.4-7.2

Size: 7.0 cm 

Life cycle: distinct pair during breeding ( spawning).

Characteristics.

* It's the second largest fish genus next to synodontis in Africa.

*It's characterized by saws and lips modified into a sucker or oral disc used for adhesiveness  and feeding upon objects in the fast flowing waters.

Differences

* It can  be distinguished from South America Sucker mouth catfishes by lack of body armour plates.

* The male are distinguished from other male species easily from elongated upper lobe of the caudal fin.

* It has a circular suckermouth disc. 

USE: it's used as food to man and other fishes in the water.

References

External links 

batesii
Freshwater fish of Africa
Fish of Cameroon
Fish of the Central African Republic
Fish of Chad
Fish of the Democratic Republic of the Congo
Fish of the Republic of the Congo
Freshwater fish of West Africa
Taxa named by George Albert Boulenger
Fish described in 1904